The Fairchild VZ-5 (or Model M-224-1) was an experimental VTOL aircraft but in the 1950s. The VZ-5 was designed by Fairchild Aircraft for research use by the United States Army.

Development
The VZ-5 prototype was built as part of a series of experimental aircraft designed to study various designs for VTOL aircraft and solve problems related to vertical and short takeoff. The VZ-5 was an all-metal high-wing monoplane with a fixed tricycle undercarriage. The fuselage had an open cockpit for one pilot and a rear-mounted high-tailplane. The unusual aspect of the aircraft was that it had one General Electric turboshaft in the rear fuselage driving four propellers, two each mounted in nacelles on the leading edge of each wing. It also had two small four-bladed tail-rotors mounted above the tailplane for control. The wing had conventional trailing edge flaps and ailerons but it also had a section of the wing that could be deflected to act as a full-span flap. For a vertical takeoff two-thirds of the wing chord acted as a flap in the slipstream of the four propellers.

The VZ-5 was first flown tethered on 18 November 1959 but only had limited testing before the project was abandoned.

Operators

United States Army

Specifications (VZ-5)

See also

References

Further reading

External links

VZ-5
1950s United States experimental aircraft
Single-engined four-prop tractor aircraft
Turboshaft-powered aircraft
High-wing aircraft
Aircraft first flown in 1959